John Fulton (25 May 1932 ― 20 February 1998) was an American bullfighter and painter who settled in Seville. 

Fulton was born on 25 May 1933 in Philadelphia, Pennsylvania. In 1953, he killed his first calf in San Miguel de Allende, a city located in the Mexican state of Guanajuato. He arrived in Algeciras, Province of Cádiz in 1956, and took the alternative in La Maestranza's bullring in Sevilla on 18 July 1963, being sponsored by José María Montilla and César Franco as a witness. He shared poster with well-known figures such as El Cordobés, Antonio Ordóñez and Pepe Luis Vázquez.

He died in Seville on 20 February 1998 from a heart attack at the age of 65.

See also
 List of bullfighters

References

1932 births
1998 deaths
People from Philadelphia
American bullfighters
American emigrants to Spain